The  Koripallon I-divisioona  is the second tier professional basketball league in Finland. The teams play playoffs for promotion to the Korisliiga.

Current clubs (2020-21)

References

External links
Presentation at Eurobasket.com

Basketball competitions in Finland
Fin